Aetana is a genus of spiders in the family Pholcidae. It was first described in 2005 by Huber. , it contains 21 species, all from the Philippines and Southeast Asia.

Species
Aetana comprises the following species:
Aetana abadae Huber, 2015
Aetana baganihan Huber, 2015
Aetana banahaw Huber, 2015
Aetana fiji Huber, 2005
Aetana gaya Huber, 2015
Aetana indah Huber, 2015
Aetana kinabalu Huber, 2005
Aetana kiukoki Huber, 2015
Aetana lambir Huber, 2015
Aetana libjo Huber, 2015
Aetana loboc Huber, 2015
Aetana lozadae Huber, 2015
Aetana manansalai Huber, 2015
Aetana mokwam Huber, 2019
Aetana ocampoi Huber, 2015
Aetana omayan Huber, 2005
Aetana ondawamei Huber, 2019
Aetana paragua Huber, 2015
Aetana pasambai Huber, 2015
Aetana poring Huber, 2015
Aetana ternate Huber, 2019

References

Pholcidae
Araneomorphae genera
Spiders of Asia